Woodger is an English surname. It is an occupational surname; originally, the word woodger meant wood-cutter. 

People with the surname Woodger include:

George Woodger (1883–1961), English international footballer
Joseph Henry Woodger (1894–1981), British theoretical biologist and philosopher of biology
Mike Woodger (born 1923), English computer pioneer
William George Woodger (1887–1979), Australian stock-and-station agent and auctioneer

English-language surnames
Occupational surnames
Surnames of English origin